David Kilpin is a male retired British wrestler.

Wrestling career
Kilpin represented England and won a bronze medal in the 100 kg heavyweight division, at the 1986 Commonwealth Games in Edinburgh, Scotland.

References

Living people
British male sport wrestlers
Wrestlers at the 1986 Commonwealth Games
Commonwealth Games bronze medallists for England
Year of birth missing (living people)
Commonwealth Games medallists in wrestling
Medallists at the 1986 Commonwealth Games